The 2001 North Carolina Tar Heels football team represented the University of North Carolina at Chapel Hill as a member of the Atlantic Coast Conference (ACC) during the 2001 NCAA Division I-A football season. Led by first-year head coach John Bunting, the Tar Heels played their home games at Kenan Memorial Stadium in Chapel Hill, North Carolina. North Carolina finished the season 8–5 overall and 5–3 in ACC play to place third. They beat Auburn in the Peach Bowl.

Schedule

Roster

Coaching staff

Team players drafted in the NFL
The following players were selected in the 2002 NFL Draft.

References

North Carolina
North Carolina Tar Heels football seasons
Peach Bowl champion seasons
North Carolina Tar Heels football